Saqeshk (also Romanized as Sāqeshk; also known as Sāgheshk, Sāqesh, Saqish, and Shākhshang) is a village in Shandiz Rural District, Shandiz District, Torqabeh and Shandiz County, Razavi Khorasan Province, Iran. At the 2006 census, its population was 33, in 11 families.

References 

Populated places in Torqabeh and Shandiz County